The Kajaani railway station was built from 1904 to 1905, when the railway from Iisalmi to Kajaani was completed as an extension to the Savonia railroad. The station building was designed by Gustaf Nyström. This Jugend building has been called the most beautiful station building in Finland.

Services
The station has a ticket vending machine and a ticket sales office. The waiting room is open during train service hours.

Trackyard
The Kajaani station trackyard underwent a large amount of upgrade and repair work in 2005, when the railway from Iisalmi to Kontiomäki was electrified. Also the manual switchboard on the Kajaani station trackyard was dismantled. Nowadays the traffic is handled remotely from Iisalmi railway station.

The trackyard has two tracks for passenger transport and five tracks for cargo transport. The trackyard has a track connection to the Lamminniemi paper factory and towards Petäisenniska.

References

External links
 VR: Kajaani station opening hours

Railway stations in Kainuu
Railway
Railway stations opened in 1905
1905 establishments in Finland